Enaj Rural District is a rural district (dehestan) in Qareh Chay District, Khondab County, Markazi Province, Iran. At the 2006 census, its population was 11,706, in 3,129 families. The rural district has 13 villages.

References 

Rural Districts of Markazi Province
Khondab County